England competed at the 2018 Commonwealth Games in Gold Coast, Australia between 4 and 15 April 2018. It was England's 21st appearance at the Commonwealth Games, having participated at every Games since their inception in 1930.

England sent a total of 394 athletes across all 18 sports, making it the largest team ever to represent the nation at an overseas sporting event. However, only 388 athletes competed. Triathlete Alistair Brownlee was the country's flag bearer during the opening ceremony.

With Birmingham as the host of the 2022 Commonwealth Games, the English segment was performed during the Closing Ceremony.

Competitors

The following is the list of number of competitors that participated at the Games per sport/discipline.

Medallists

| style="text-align:left; vertical-align:top;"|

Relay competitors named in italics did not participate in the corresponding finals.

Athletics

On 24 October 2017, Commonwealth Games England announced a squad of 75 athletes consisting of 35 men and 40 women. Since the initial announcement, selected relay athletes were given permission to fill any remaining slots in the individual sprints.

On 11 December 2017, Commonwealth Games England announced the selection of eighteen athletes to compete in the para-athletic events in Gold Coast. Jade Jones will compete in both the para-athletics and paratriathlon.

Men

Track & road events

Field Events

Combined events – Decathlon

Women

Track & road events

Field events

Combined events – Heptathlon

Relay competitors named in italics did not participate in the corresponding finals.

Badminton

On 8 February 2018, Team England announced its squad of 10 players, 5 of which are male and 5 female.

Singles

Doubles

Mixed team

Summary

Squad

Chris Adcock
Gabby Adcock
Chloe Birch
Marcus Ellis
Ben Lane
Chris Langridge
Rajiv Ouseph
Jessica Pugh
Lauren Smith
Sarah Walker

Pool C

Basketball

England has qualified both men's and women's teams for a total of 24 athletes. The men's team was invited by FIBA and the CGF, while the women's team qualified as being one of the top three ranked teams in the Commonwealth (minus the host nation Australia). Each team will consist of twelve players.

Both teams were announced on 16 March 2018.

Summary

Men's tournament

Roster

Adam Thoseby
Andrew Lasker
Andrew Thomson
Callum Jones
Daniel Edozie
Jamell Anderson
Joseph Ikhinmwin
Kofi Josephs
Michael Tuck (Captain)
Orlan Jackman
Robert Gilchrist
Shane Walker

Pool B

Qualifying final

Women's tournament

Roster

Pool A

Qualifying Final

Semi-final

Final

Beach volleyball

England qualified both men's and women's teams based on the FIVB Beach Volleyball World Rankings as at 31 October 2017. On 23 November 2017, Commonwealth Games England announced the selection of the two pairs who will compete for England at the Games.

Boxing

On 6 February 2018, Team England announced its squad of 12 boxers, 8 of which are male and 4 female.

Men

Women

Cycling

On 6 March 2018, Team England announced its squad of 27 cyclists, of which 14 are male and 13 female.

Road

Track
Sprint

Keirin

Time trial

Pursuit

Points race

Scratch race

Mountain bike

Diving

On 5 February 2018, Team England announced its squad of 13 divers, 9 of which are male and 4 female.

Men

Women

Gymnastics

On 12 February 2018, Team England announced its squad of 3 rhythmic gymnasts. The initial 10-strong artistic gymnastics squad (5 men and 5 women) was added on 21 February 2018 and the current make-up is correct as of 28 March 2018.

Artistic

Men
Team Final & Individual Qualification

Individual Finals

Women
Team Final & Individual Qualification

Individual Finals

Rhythmic
Team Final & Individual Qualification

Individual Finals

Hockey

England qualified both a men's and women's hockey team by placing in the top nine (excluding the host nation, Australia) among Commonwealth nations in the FIH World Rankings as of 31 October 2017. Each team consists of 18 athletes, for a total of 36.

The men's team was announced on 12 March 2018. Following an initial announcement on 15 March 2018, the women's team was confirmed on 20 March 2018.

Summary

Men's tournament

Squad

Liam Ansell
David Condon
Brendan Creed
Adam Dixon
James Gall
Harry Gibson
Mark Gleghorne
David Goodfield
Chris Griffiths
Harry Martin
Barry Middleton
George Pinner
Phil Roper
Liam Sanford
Ian Sloan
Sam Ward
Henry Weir
Ollie Willars

Pool B

Semi-finals

Bronze medal match

Women's tournament

Squad

Giselle Ansley
Grace Balsdon
Sophie Bray
Alex Danson
Emily Defroand
Sarah Haycroft
Maddie Hinch
Jo Hunter
Kathryn Lane
Hannah Martin
Hollie Pearne-Webb
Suzy Petty
Ellie Rayer
Amy Tennant
Anna Toman
Susannah Townsend
Laura Unsworth
Ellie Watton

Pool A

Semi-finals

Bronze medal match

Lawn bowls

On 13 November 2017, Commonwealth Games England announced a full squad consisting of 15 bowlers, 9 of which are male and 6 female. Along with the other athletes, 2 directors were announced, Mark and Sue Wherry, who will assist the visually impaired athletes in the para-lawn bowls.

Men

Women

Para-bowls

Netball

England qualified a netball team by virtue of being ranked in the top 11 (excluding the host nation, Australia) of the INF World Rankings on 1 July 2017.

The squad was announced on 14 February 2018.

Summary

Pool B

Semi Final

Final

Rugby sevens

England qualified both men's and women's teams by finishing as one of the top nine Commonwealth Games Association sides in the 2016-17 World Rugby Sevens Series and as one of the top six sides at the 2016-17 World Rugby Women's Sevens Series respectively, as of 1 July 2017. Each team gets 12 players and a reserve.

The women's squad was announced on 26 March 2018. The men's squad was provisionally selected a few days later, although it was not officially announced until 3 April 2018.

Summary

Men's tournament

Squad

Alex Davis
Tom Mitchell
Dan Norton
Dan Bibby
Ethan Waddleton
Harry Glover
James Rodwell
Mike Ellery
Ollie Lindsay-Hague
Phil Burgess
Richard de Carpentier
Ruaridh McConnochie
Charles Hayter (reserve)

Pool B

Semi-finals

Bronze medal match

Women's tournament

Squad

Abbie Brown
Claire Allan
Lydia Thompson
Emily Scarratt
Natasha Hunt
Deborah Fleming
Heather Fisher
Emily Scott
Alex Matthews
Megan Jones
Jessica Breach
Amy Wilson-Hardy
Victoria Fleetwood (reserve)

Pool B

Semi-finals

Bronze medal match

Shooting

On 6 December 2017, Team England announced the majority of its 21-strong squad (13 men and 8 women). Another shooter was added at a later date.

Men
Pistol/Small bore

Shotgun

Women
Pistol/Small bore

Shotgun

Open
Queen's Prize (full bore)

Squash

On 16 February 2018, Team England announced its squad of 9 players, consisting of 5 men and 4 women.

Singles

Doubles

Swimming

Team England announced its squad in two tranches.

The first tranche of 15 swimmers was announced on 4 October 2017. After the Swim England National Winter Championships, a second tranche of 24 swimmers was announced on 5 January 2018.

Jonathan Fox and Oliver Hynd have since withdrawn after their recent reclassifications by the IPC.

Men

Women

Qualifiers for the latter rounds (Q) of all events were decided on a time only basis, therefore positions shown are overall results versus competitors in all heats.
Relay competitors named in italics did not participate in the corresponding finals.

Table tennis

On 7 February 2018, Team England announced its squad of 11 players, 6 of which are male and 5 female.

Singles

Doubles

Team

Para-sport

Triathlon

On 29 November 2017, Team England announced its squad of 10 triathletes, consisting of 5 men and 5 women.

Individual

Mixed Relay

Paratriathlon

Weightlifting

On 12 January 2018, Team England announced its squad of 18 weightlifters and powerlifters, 8 of which are male and 10 female.

Men

Women

Powerlifting

Wrestling

On 13 February 2018, Team England announced its squad of 5 wrestlers, which consists of 4 men and 1 woman.

Men

Women

References

England at the Commonwealth Games
Nations at the 2018 Commonwealth Games
2018 in English sport